Øystein Kåre Djupedal (born 5 May 1960) is a Norwegian politician.

Djupedal was born in Oslo, Norway, and is the son of the linguist Reidar Djupedal. He is a Norwegian politician for the Socialist Left Party (SV), and was a member of Storting for Sør-Trøndelag County, where he has sat from the 1993 election until 2009. For two years, from 2005 to 2007, he was the Minister of Education and Research. He is also former deputy leader of the Socialist Left Party. From 2008 until 2015 he was the County Governor of Aust-Agder, although Svein Åril was the acting governor for him from 2008 until 2009 when he finished his Parliamentary term.

References

Socialist Left Party (Norway) politicians
Living people
1960 births
Members of the Storting
Government ministers of Norway
21st-century Norwegian politicians
20th-century Norwegian politicians
Ministers of Education of Norway